MPKI may refer to:
 Managed Public Key Infrastructure, a computer security technology offered as service
 Missed Predictions per 1000 (=Kilo) Instructions, a characteristic variable in computer architecture to measure the quality of branch prediction